The 2017 West Coast Conference men's basketball tournament was a postseason men's basketball tournament for the West Coast Conference held March 3–7, 2017 at the Orleans Arena in Paradise, Nevada.  Regular-season champion Gonzaga also won the WCC tournament, and with it the conference's automatic bid into the 2017 NCAA tournament with a 74-56 win over Saint Mary's in the finals.

The WCC's eight-year tournament contract with Orleans Arena expired after the 2016 WCC tournament, with the WCC looking to potentially moving the tournament to a different Las Vegas-area venue (the MGM Grand Garden Arena or the T-Mobile Arena), keep it at the Orleans Arena, or move it elsewhere. In May 2016, the WCC announced that it reached an agreement on a new three-year contract with the Orleans Arena, which will run through the 2019 WCC year-end tournament.

Seeds
All 10 WCC teams were eligible for the tournament. The top six teams received a first round bye. Teams were seeded by record within the conference, with a tiebreaker system to seed teams with identical conference records.

Schedule

Bracket

Game summaries

First round

No. 8 Pepperdine vs. No. 9 Pacific
Broadcasters: Dave McCann, Blaine Fowler
Series History: Pacific leads 31–27

No. 7 San Diego vs. No. 10 Portland 
Broadcasters: Dave McCann, Blaine Fowler 
Series History: San Diego leads 52–29

Quarterfinals

No. 3 BYU vs. No. 6 Loyola Marymount
Broadcasters: Dave McCann, Blaine Fowler 
Series History: BYU leads 13–3

No. 4 Santa Clara vs. No. 5 San Francisco
Broadcasters: Dave McCann, Blaine Fowler 
Series History: Santa Clara leads 79–76

No. 1 Gonzaga vs. No. 9 Pacific
Broadcasters: Roxy Bernstein, Jon Barry
Series History: Gonzaga leads 12–1

No. 2 Saint Mary's vs. No. 10 Portland
Broadcasters: Roxy Bernstein, Jon Barry 
Series History: Saint Mary's leads 65–29

Semifinals

No. 1 Gonzaga vs. No. 4 Santa Clara
Broadcasters: Dave O'Brien, Dick Vitale, Jeff Goodman
Series History: Gonzaga leads 59–30

No. 2 Saint Mary's vs. No. 3 BYU
Broadcasters: Dave O'Brien, Jon Barry, Jeff Goodman
Series History: BYU leads 12–11

Championship

No. 1 Gonzaga vs. No. 2 Saint Mary's
Broadcasters: Dave O'Brien, Dick Vitale, Jeff Goodman
Series History: Gonzaga leads 67–29

See also

West Coast Conference men's basketball tournament
2017 West Coast Conference women's basketball tournament

References

Tournament
West Coast Conference men's basketball tournament
West Coast Athletic Conference men's basketball tournament
West Coast Athletic Conference men's basketball tournament
Basketball competitions in the Las Vegas Valley
21st century in Las Vegas
College basketball tournaments in Nevada
College sports tournaments in Nevada